Mount Kosvinsky Kamen, Kosvinsky Mountain, Kosvinski Mountain, Kosvinsky Rock or Rostesnoy Rock is a mountain in the northern Urals, Sverdlovsk Oblast, Russia.

Its summit is bare of vegetation with an uneven rocky surface and small lakes fed by melting snow. The Kosva River flows from the mountain, hence the name.

The Great Soviet Encyclopedia describes Kosvinsky Rock as "mountain massif" of height 1,519 m. Its constitution is pyroxenites and dunites of lower and middle Paleozoic era. The slopes are covered with conifers with some birch up to 900–1000 m, with alpine tundra above.

Military
According to a 1 April 1997 article in the Washington Times, a CIA report claimed that there were construction works for a "nuclear-survivable, strategic command post at Kosvinsky Mountain".
It was designed to resist US earth penetrating weapons and serves a similar role as the American Cheyenne Mountain Complex.

It is claimed that the command post of the Perimeter system is in the bunker under Kosvinsky Kamen mountain.

See also
Mount Yamantau - another Soviet/Russian subterranean facility

References

Mountains of Sverdlovsk Oblast